The 2018–19 season was Paksi FC's 13th competitive season, 13th consecutive season in the OTP Bank Liga and 66th year in existence as a football club.

First team squad

Transfers

Summer

In:

Out:

Source:

Winter

In:

Out:

Statistics

Appearances and goals
Last updated on 19 May 2019.

|-
|colspan="14"|Youth players:

|-
|colspan="14"|Players no longer at the club:

|}

Top scorers
Includes all competitive matches. The list is sorted by shirt number when total goals are equal.
Last updated on 19 May 2019

Disciplinary record
Includes all competitive matches. Players with 1 card or more included only.

Last updated on 19 May 2019

Overall
{|class="wikitable"
|-
|Games played || 38 (33 OTP Bank Liga and 5 Hungarian Cup)
|-
|Games won || 12 (9 OTP Bank Liga and 3 Hungarian Cup)
|-
|Games drawn || 13 (12 OTP Bank Liga and 1 Hungarian Cup)
|-
|Games lost || 13 (12 OTP Bank Liga and 1 Hungarian Cup)
|-
|Goals scored || 45
|-
|Goals conceded || 53
|-
|Goal difference || -8
|-
|Yellow cards || 102
|-
|Red cards || 7
|-
||Worst discipline ||  Bence Lenzsér (15 , 1 )
|-
||Best result || 5–0 (A) v Siklós - Magyar Kupa - 22-09-2018
|-
||Worst result || 0–4 (H) v MOL Vidi - Nemzeti Bajnokság I - 3-11-2018
|-
||Most appearances ||  János Hahn (35 appearances)
|-
||Top scorer ||  János Hahn (11 goals)
|-
|Points || 49/114 (42.98%)
|-

Nemzeti Bajnokság I

Matches

League table

Results summary

Results by round

Hungarian Cup

References

External links
 Official Website
 UEFA
 fixtures and results

Hungarian football clubs 2018–19 season
Paksi SE seasons